Franklin Park School District 84 is a school district headquartered in Franklin Park, Illinois. The district operates five schools: North Elementary School, Lawrence W. Passow Elementary School, Dan H. Pietrini Elementary School, Vance C. Hester Junior High School and East Early Childhood Center.

References

External links
 

School districts in Cook County, Illinois